Eric Thomas Ramsay (born 2 August 1979) is a Scottish professional golfer.

Ramsay was born in Dundee. In 2005 he won the Australian Amateur and finished in a tie for 23rd place at the 2005 Open Championship, one stroke behind Lloyd Saltman in the race for the silver medal as the low amateur. He turned professional later that year.

Ramsay has played on the second tier European Challenge Tour since 2006 and picked up his first victory on tour in 2009 at the DHL Wroclaw Challenge.

Amateur wins
2005 Australian Amateur

Professional wins (1)

Challenge Tour wins (1)

Results in major championships

Note: Ramsay only played in The Open Championship.
"T" = tied

Team appearances
Amateur
European Amateur Team Championship (representing Scotland): 2005

References

External links

Scottish male golfers
European Tour golfers
Sportspeople from Dundee
1979 births
Living people